In the Kashmir Shaivism tradition, Svacchandanath is an Avatar of Shiva, said to have revealed the ninety two Tantras, at the beginning of the Satya Yuga. Svacchandanath had five heads (and importantly, five mouths), that represented the five universal energies: cit shakti, ānanda shakti, īccha shakti, jñāna shakti, kriya shakti, and eighteen arms, representing and alternative view, of the thirty six tattvas.

Shaivism
Hindu tantra